Reifs Mills is an unincorporated community located in the towns of Franklin and Kossuth, Manitowoc County, Wisconsin, United States.

The community was named after the Reif brothers, proprietors of a local mill.

Notes

Unincorporated communities in Manitowoc County, Wisconsin
Unincorporated communities in Wisconsin